Sabine Anne Sparwasser is Germany's Ambassador to Canada (since 2017).  She was Consul General in Toronto from 2009 until 2013 and Chargé d’Affaires/Deputy Head of Mission at their Embassy in Ottawa from 2003 until 2006.  From 2015 until 2017, she was Germany's Special Representative of the Federal Government for Afghanistan and Pakistan.,

Education
 Diplôme de l’Institut d’Etudes Politiques de Paris, Study of Political Sciences with specialization in International Relations, Paris 1981-1983
 Johannes Gutenberg University Mainz, Studies of German, French, English Literature and Linguistics 1976-1981

References

German women ambassadors
Ambassadors of Germany to Canada
Year of birth missing (living people)
Living people
Place of birth missing (living people)
Sciences Po alumni
Johannes Gutenberg University Mainz alumni